The Bonneville Power Administration (BPA) is an American federal agency operating in the Pacific Northwest. BPA was created by an act of Congress in 1937 to market electric power from the Bonneville Dam located on the Columbia River and to construct facilities necessary to transmit that power. Congress has since designated Bonneville to be the marketing agent for power from all of the federally owned hydroelectric projects in the Pacific Northwest. Bonneville is one of four regional Federal power marketing agencies within the U.S. Department of Energy (DOE).

Operations

The power generated on BPA's grid is sold to public utilities, private utilities, and industry on the grid. The excess is sold to other grids in Canada, California and other regions. Because BPA is a public entity, it does not make a profit on power sales or from providing transmission services. BPA also coordinates with the U.S. Army Corps of Engineers and the U.S. Bureau of Reclamation to regulate flow of water in the Columbia River and to carry out environmental projects such as salmon restoration.

Although BPA is part of the DOE, it is self-funded and covers its costs by selling its products and services at cost. The BPA provides about 28% of the electricity used in the region. BPA transmits and sells wholesale electricity in eight western states: Washington, Oregon, Idaho, Montana, Wyoming, Utah, Nevada, and California.

BPA now markets the electricity from thirty-one federal hydroelectric dams on the Columbia River and its tributaries, as well as from the Columbia Generating Station, a nuclear plant located on the Hanford Site in eastern Washington. BPA has more than 15,000 miles (24,000 km) of electrical lines and 261 substations in the Pacific Northwest and controls approximately 75 percent of the high-voltage (230 kV and higher) transmission capacity in the region. 

BPA also maintains connection lines with other power grids.  It connects to the California high-voltage transmission system by Path 66, which consists of the two 500 kV AC lines of the Pacific AC Intertie, plus a third 500 kV AC line of the California-Oregon Transmission Project (COTP) (managed by the Balancing Authority of Northern California). Together these three lines are operated as the California-Oregon Intertie (COI) (managed by the California Independent System Operator CAISO). An additional DC ±500 kV line, the Pacific DC Intertie, links BPA's grid at the Celilo Converter Station near The Dalles, Oregon to the Los Angeles Department of Water and Power (LADWP) grid 800 miles (1,300 km) away at the Sylmar Converter Station in Los Angeles.

The Northern Intertie crosses the Canada–US border in two locations at Blaine, Washington and Nelway, British Columbia and connects to two BC Hydro AC 500 kV lines and several lower voltage lines.

Because BPA owns and operates transmission equipment and locations, its workers perform its own vegetation management.

BPA uses helicopters to sling load maintenance workers inspecting and repairing power lines.

History

BPA's first industrial sale was to Alcoa in January 1940, to provide 32,500 kilowatts of power. This, and the following 162,500 kilowatt order, led to complaints of the Bonneville Power Act's anti-monopoly clause. The cheap price of aluminum from Alcoa helped aluminum sales grow in the post-World War II market.

Overly optimistic estimates of future electricity consumption by BPA in the 1960s led the agency to guarantee some bonds for the disastrous Washington Public Power Supply System nuclear power project. Out of five nuclear power plants started (WNP-1 and WNP-4, WNP-3 and WNP-5), only WNP-2 was completed. BPA is still making payments on three of the abandoned plants. In 2003, BPA's debt for the nuclear project totaled $6.2 billion.

In 1973, Bill Gates and Paul Allen were hired by Bob Barnett to write software for the PDP-10 computer that managed BPA's power grid and remained in operation until 2013.

In 2014, the BPA Library discovered a collection of old films made by the agency and began posting digital versions of them on the agency's website. Included in the collection is the award-winning documentary "River of Power" which covers the Agency's history from its beginning to the present.

The BPA gives its name to the BPA Trail in Federal Way, Washington, a walking trail built beneath the power transmission lines.

Administrators

Notes

See also 
Tennessee Valley Authority
Power Marketing Administration
Western Interconnection
BPA Trail, Federal Way
Bonneville Environmental Foundation

References

Archives
Charles F. Luce papers. 1654–2000. 6.13 cubic feet.
Brock Adams papers. 1947–1993. 326.64 cubic feet (456 boxes).
George H. Barker Collection of Dam Construction Photographs and Ephemera. 1935-1952. 243 photographic prints, 18 newspaper clippings (1 box).

External links 

Bonneville Power Administration in the Federal Register
Historic American Engineering Record (HAER) documentation:

Columbia River
New Deal agencies
United States Department of Energy
Companies based in Portland, Oregon
Renewable energy in the United States
New Deal in Oregon
Public utilities of the United States
Water management authorities in the United States